East Feliciana Parish is a parish located in the U.S. state of Louisiana. At the 2020 census, the population was 19,531. The parish seat is Clinton.

Established when Feliciana Parish was divided in 1824, both East and West Feliciana parishes are part of the Baton Rouge metropolitan statistical area. They are also considered part of the Florida Parishes, at one time part of Spain's West Florida colony.

History
The parish was part of Feliciana Parish, which was founded and named in 1810 by Spaniards who then controlled the territory. The Spanish governor, Bernardo de Gálvez, named it in honor of his wife, Marie Felicité.

After the United States annexed this territory, population continued to increase. It had been developed for sugar cane plantations and business was thriving. In 1824, the state legislature divided the parish into East Feliciana Parish and West Feliciana Parish, so that residents would have easier access to their parish seats.

The Louisiana State Insane Asylum was the first state institution in the parish, established near the town of Jackson in 1847. It was greatly enlarged and improved under the administration of Dr. John Welch Jones, who was appointed as superintendent in 1874, during the Reconstruction era. The bi-racial legislators in power at the time made commitments to public education and state welfare institutions. The facility was later called East Louisiana State Hospital.

Geography

Major highways
  U.S. Highway 61
  Louisiana Highway 10
  Louisiana Highway 19
  Louisiana Highway 63
  Louisiana Highway 67
  Louisiana Highway 68
  Louisiana Highway 69

Adjacent parishes and counties
 Wilkinson County, Mississippi  (northwest)
 Amite County, Mississippi  (northeast)
 St. Helena Parish  (east)
 East Baton Rouge Parish  (south)
 West Feliciana Parish  (west)

Communities

Towns 

 Clinton (parish seat)
 Jackson (largest municipality)
 Slaughter

Villages 
 Norwood
 Wilson

Unincorporated communities 
 Bluff Creek
 Ethel
 Gurley

Demographics

At the 2019 American Community Survey, there were 19,371 people living in the parish, down from 20,267 at the 2010 United States census. The 2019 census-estimated population comprised 6,959 households living in 8,487 housing units spread throughout the parish. There were 1,595 businesses operating in East Feliciana. By the 2020 United States census, there were 19,539 people, 6,959 households, and 4,777 families residing in the parish.

In 2010, the racial and ethnic makeup of the parish was the following: 53.2% were White, 44.9% Black and African American, 0.3% American Indian and Alaska Native, 0.3% Asian, 0.2% of some other race and 1.1% of two or more races; 1.0% were Hispanic or Latin American of any race. At the 2019 census-estimates, 54.5% were non-Hispanic white, 43.6% Black and African American, 0.5% American Indian and Alaska Native, 0.3% Asian, 0.2% some other race, and 0.9% multiracial. Hispanics and Latin Americans of any race made up 1.7% of the total population. During the 2020 census, the parish's race and ethnic composition was 58.3% non-Hispanic white, 36.38% Black and African American, 0.31% Native American, 0.24% Asian, 0.05% Pacific Islander, 2.63% other or multiracial, and 2.0% Hispanic or Latino of any race.

As of 2019-2021's census estimates, approximately 40% of the population was employed in the parish, and the home-ownership rate was 80.5%. The median value of owner-occupied housing units was $139,300, and median gross rent was $647. Residents had a median household income of $51,803; males earned a median income of $61,105 versus $32,243 for females. At the 2000 United States census, the median household income was $31,631, and the median family income was $37,278. Males had a median income of $31,804 versus $20,243 for females. The per capita income for the parish was $15,428. An estimated 23.3% of the parish lived at or below the poverty line in 2019, up from 23% at the 2000 U.S. census.

According to the Association of Religion Data Archives in 2020, the Southern Baptist Convention was the parish's largest Christian denomination, Christianity being the largest religion as part of the Bible Belt. Southern Baptists were spread out in 16 congregations and numbered 5,248; following, United Methodists numbered 1,636. Roman Catholicism had 250 adherents.

Education
East Feliciana Parish School Board operates public schools in the parish. Elementary schools include Jackson Elementary School, Slaughter Elementary School, and Clinton Elementary School. Upper public schools include East Feliciana Middle and High school. Some students in the parish attend Wilkinson County Christian Academy in Wilkinson County, Mississippi.

The parish is in the service area of Baton Rouge Community College.

Silliman Institute in Clinton was established in the late 1960s as a directed response to federal courts ordering the desegregation of the East Feliciana public school system.

Government and infrastructure
The East Feliciana Parish Police Jury is the governing body of the parish and consists of nine representatives elected by district.

East Louisiana State Hospital, currently referred to as Eastern Louisiana Mental Health System is located in Jackson. Its main building is considered to be one of the largest and most significant Greek Revival buildings in Louisiana, it has been placed on the National Register of Historic Places. The institution was one of the first mental hospitals in the South.

The Louisiana Department of Public Safety and Corrections operates the Dixon Correctional Institute in Jackson.

Notable people

 Donna Douglas (1932-2015), actress who starred on The Beverly Hillbillies. She is buried in Bluff Creek's Baptist Church cemetery.
 Erick Erickson, Editor of RedState
 Thomas Jackson, Sr. (1757-1844), fought in Revolutionary War.
 John Welch Jones (1826-1916), medical doctor, Confederate cavalry officer and one-time superintendent of the Louisiana State Insane Asylum
 Junius Wallace Jones (1890-1977), Major-General, United States Air Force
 Lawrence Brooks (1909-2022), the oldest American veteran of World War II, was born in Norwood.
 Tom McVea, former state representative and former member of the East Feliciana Parish Police Jury
 Eddie Robinson, legendary football coach at Grambling State University, was born in Jackson, Louisiana.
 Richard Stalder, former secretary of the Louisiana Department of Public Safety and Corrections from 1992 to 2008; former warden of Dixon Correctional Institute in Jackson
 E. M. Toler, physician and coroner who served in the Louisiana State Senate for East and West Feliciana parishes from 1944 to 1954
 John D. Travis (1940-2016), state representative for District 62, including his native East Feliciana Parish, 1984 to 2000
 Kendell Beckwith, NFL player, currently plays for the Tampa Bay Buccaneers.  Attended East Feliciana High School and went on to play for the LSU Tigers before being drafted by Tampa Bay.

See also
 National Register of Historic Places listings in East Feliciana Parish, Louisiana
 Louisville, New Orleans and Texas RailwayClinton and Port Hudson Railroad

References

External links
 East Feliciana Parish Police Jury
 East Feliciana Tourism
 Explore the History and Culture of Southeastern Louisiana, a National Park Service Discover Our Shared Heritage Travel Itinerary

 
Louisiana parishes
Baton Rouge metropolitan area
1824 establishments in Louisiana
Populated places established in 1824
Louisiana parishes on the Mississippi River